Morris Municipal Airport , also known as Charlie Schmidt Field, is a public use airport three miles (5 km) southwest of Morris in Stevens County, Minnesota. It is owned and operated by the City of Morris.

The airport is named after longtime Morris resident Charlie Schmidt, the founder of the Minnesota "Flying Farmers." Schmidt was an aerial applicator and flight instructor.

Facilities and aircraft 
Morris Municipal Airport - Charlie Schmidt Field covers 163 acres encompassing two runways. Runway 14/32 serves as the main runway with an asphalt surface measuring 4,002 by 75 feet. Runway 4/22 is turf and serves as the crosswind runway measuring 2,637 by 145 feet. The turf runway at MOX is closed during the winter.

The airport features an arrival and departure building built in 1990 for general aviation and several hangars. In addition to recreational use, the airport is used by corporate air taxi flights, aerial agriculture spraying planes, and daily United Parcel Service cargo feeder flights from Fargo, North Dakota. The cargo flights are operated by Bemidji Airlines.

In 2017, the airport had 5,906 aircraft operations, with 19 aircraft based at the field.

Flying clubs at the airport include Morris-Hancock Flying Club and Pomme De Terre Flying Club.

History 
The airport was built under a Works Progress Administration grant in 1940. The airport opened in 1942 with four turf runways ranging in length from 1700 to 3400 feet long. The newly opened airport hosted a Civilian Pilot Training Program during World War II. In the early 1960s the east–west turf runway was closed, and the north–south turf runway was closed in the early 1980s. In 1961 state and federal funding was used to grade a new Runway 14–32, and regrade the north–south runway. In 1965 state and federal funding was used to pave runway 14–32 at 3000 feet by 75 feet and to install runway lighting. In 1984 Runway 14-32 was reconstructed and lengthened to 3400 feet. In 2003 the runway was extended another 600 feet to its current length. In 2016 a parallel taxiway for runway 14-32 was constructed.

Airlines and destinations

Cargo

References

External links 
Morris Municipal Airport, official website

Airports in Minnesota
Buildings and structures in Stevens County, Minnesota
Airports established in 1942
1942 establishments in Minnesota